Glenunga International High School (GIHS), formerly Glenunga High School (GHS), is a publicly-funded international school in Adelaide, South Australia. The school serves the surrounding suburbs of the cities of Unley, Burnside and the Adelaide Hills.

Glenunga offers the Ignite program for gifted students as well as the IB Diploma Programme.  the principal is Wendy Johnson.

History
The school was established in 1903 from the defunct Adelaide Agricultural School (founded 1897 with Andrew Ferguson as headmaster) as the Preparatory School for the South Australian School of Mines and Industries. It was renamed the Junior Technical School in 1914 and then Adelaide Technical High School in 1918. The school and the Old Scholars Association marked 1998 as the centenary year.

It was located at the School of Mines building (which houses Brookman Hall — named for benefactor George Brookman) on the corner of North Terrace and Frome Road, now part of the City East campus of the University of South Australia. The school population outgrew the campus, so in 1964 it was relocated to its current location in Glenunga, and was renamed Glenunga High School in 1974. It adopted its current name upon the introduction of the International Baccalaureate Diploma Programme in 1990–91 with the aid of The Honourable Greg Crafter, a development which was instigated to help save the school from closure due to dwindling student numbers. With enrolments rising, GIHS has subsequently attracted substantial government funding and construction projects, most notably the technology and science wing extensions, a new administration block, and a performing arts centre; since 2005 there have been various additional changes to the facilities, such as extra rooms.

In 2013, development began for a new $10 million building to accommodate the growing number of students. This new building was accompanied by the renovation of the Music, Sciences and Art departments, as well as a new library. The development upgrades were completed in 2014.

In 2020, the construction began for new buildings including technology facilities, science labs and classrooms began. The total cost of the new plan is roughly $32 million. The construction has been completed at the start of 2022 for the introduction of year 7s into the school, which fully opened to students and staff in mid-Term 1.

Student life
Glenunga International High School hosts an array of extracurricular groups, all of which are student-run. These include special-interest clubs, a variety of community service organisations, as well as various sporting teams.As of 2015, Glenunga has over 50 student-led clubs, which include Literature, Musical Theatre, Debating, Chess, Science and Raspberry Pi, amongst others.

Glenunga International High School has an extensive student leadership model, which gives any student the opportunity to make change within the school community. This includes the Learner, International Mindedness, and Wellbeing Councils, student driven bodies who co-ordinate events and a number of other responsibilities.

Academic performance
Glenunga continues to foster some of the academically highest-achieving students in the state.

In 2016, 20 students across both the SACE and IB diplomas achieved an ATAR of 99 or more — a score in the top 1% of students nationwide for that year.

Notable staff members
Daniel Becker — Sciences teacher, 2019, current
Dave Dallwitz — Art teacher, c. 1954–1964
Ivor Francis — Art teacher, 1944–1947
Doru Frîncu (Francu) — P. E. teacher, 2009–present
Sam Kellett — English teacher, 2013–2014
Geoff Kemp — English and Drama teacher, current
Paul Mildren — Member of the Australian baseball team; P. E. teacher, 2015–present
Joe Scalzi — Social sciences, 2008–2010
Rex Wright — P. E. teacher, 2011–2020

Notable alumni and alumnae

G(I)HS (1974–present)
Stanley Browning — Actor
Leanne Choo — Australian representative at the 2012 and 2016 Olympics in badminton
William Henzell — Represented Australia at the 2004 and 2008 Olympics in table tennis
Finegan Kruckemeyer — Playwright
Giang Nguyen — Mathematician
Raphaela Wiget — Australian Ninja Warrior contestant, seasons 3 and 4
Cameron Wood — AFL footballer with the Brisbane Lions (2005–2007), Collingwood Football Club (2008–2012), and Carlton Football Club (2014–2016)

ATHS
Peter Badcoe — Victoria Cross recipient. Killed in action during the Vietnam War
Mark Brindal — Politician
Sir Walter Crocker — Diplomat, Lieutenant-Governor of South Australia
Bruce R. Davis — Electronics engineer
Maurice de Rohan — Engineer, Agent General for South Australia
Norm Duncan — VFL footballer with South Melbourne
Merle Honor Marten — Holden artist, Mayoress of Port Adelaide
Harry Medlin — Deputy Chancellor of the University of Adelaide
Vince Monterola — CEO of the SA Country Fire Service
Ong Teng Cheong — President of Singapore, politician, architect, town planner
Kevin Peek — Classical/rock guitarist
Reg Sprigg — Geologist, conservationist
James Cyril Stobie — Inventor of the Stobie pole
Alfred Traeger — Inventor of the pedal radio

Adelaide Agricultural School (1897–1902)
Sir Richard Layton Butler
A. E. V. Richardson

References and notes

External links

Blue and Gold Alumni Association

City of Burnside
Educational institutions established in 1898
Public schools in South Australia
Special interest high schools in South Australia
International Baccalaureate schools in Australia
Ignite high schools in South Australia
1898 establishments in Australia